The 1968 Boston University Terriers football team was an American football team that represented Boston University as an independent during the 1968 NCAA College Division football season. In its fifth and final season under head coach Warren Schmakel, the team compiled a 5–3–1 record and was outscored by a total of 125 to 117.

Schedule

References

Boston University
Boston University Terriers football seasons
Boston University Terriers football